The Forum of German Catholics is a conservative Catholic lay organization in Germany. It was founded in 2000 in opposition to the Central Committee of German Catholics.

History and function 
The Forum of German Catholics was founded on 30 September 2000 in the Roman Catholic Diocese of Fulda and is based in Kaufering, Bavaria. It is an official religious organization registered with the German government. It was founded by Hubert Gienten, with the guidance of Archbishop Johannes Dyba. A conservative organization, it was formed in opposition to the Central Committee of German Catholics.

The forum, made up of members of the Catholic laity, claims to be committed to "unadulterated and unabridged" faith. It hosts congresses and other events, focused on Catholic teaching and ministry. Since 2001, the forum hosts the annual Congress on Joy of Faith, taking place in Fulda and Regensburg. In 2002 the congress was officiated by Cardinal Joseph Ratzinger. In 2009, the forum released a resolution stating that Muslims were natural allies in the "fight against a culture of death". The resolution also stated that the "systematic displacement of the Christian faith from politics and public life" was the most dangerous threat in Europe. Participants of the 2009 conference included Archbishop Jean-Claude Perisset, Bishop Gregor Maria Hanke, Bishop Friedhelm Hofmann, and Bishop Karl-Heinz Wiesemann. In 2014 the congress's opening ceremony was officiated by Cardinal Gerhard Ludwig Müller.

Controversies 
In 2007 Eva Herman, who has been accused of promoting ideas from the Third Reich, served as a guest speaker at the forum's seventh annual congress. Her involvement was criticized by Dieter Graumann, Vice President of the Central Council of Jews in Germany. Herman's involvement was also protested by Alois Rhiel, the Minister of Economics in Hesse, who resigned from his patronage of the congress.

In 2019 the forum called for Catholic women to boycott the Catholic German Women's Association, after the organization had shown support for the Mary 2.0 movement.

Board of trustees 

 Alois-Konstantin, 9th Prince of Löwenstein-Wertheim-Rosenberg
 Gloria, Princess of Thurn and Taxis
 Baroness Hedwig von Beverfoerde
 Cardinal Gerhard Ludwig Müller
 Cardinal Paul Josef Cordes
 Bishop Heinz Josef Algermissen
 Manfred Christ
 Edmund Dillinger
 Norbert Geis
 Gabriele Kuby
 Bernd Posselt
 Peter Gauweiler
 Werner Münch
 Anton Ziegenaus
 Lothar Roos
 Hans Alois Schieser
 Wolfgang Ockenfels
 Konrad Löw
 Andreas Laun
 Bishop Christoph Casetti
 Josef Grabmeier

Deceased members of the board of trustees 

 Archduke Otto, Crown Prince of Austria
 Countess Johanna von Westphalen
 Count Leo-Ferdinand Henckel von Donnersmarck
 Count Hans von Huyn
 Cardinal Paul Augustin Mayer
 Cardinal Joachim Meisner
 Cardinal Leo Scheffczyk
 Karin Struck
 Gontard Jaster
 Aloysius Winter

References

External links 
 Forum of German Catholics

2000 establishments in Germany
Catholic Church in Germany
Christian organizations established in 2000
Christian political organizations
Conservatism in Germany
Fulda
Organisations based in Bavaria